Marvin Kirkland Cox (born August 17, 1957) is an American retired politician and educator. A Republican and a former high school teacher, he served in the Virginia House of Delegates from 1990 to 2022, representing the 66th District. From 2018 to 2020, he served as the 55th Speaker of the House of Delegates. Cox served as House Majority Leader from 2010 to 2018 and House Majority Whip from 2004 to 2010.

In October 2020, Cox filed papers to establish a campaign committee preparing to seek the Republican nomination for Governor of Virginia, but said he would not formally announce until after the November presidential election. On November 17, 2020, Cox formally launched his campaign for governor. On May 11, 2021 he conceded to Glenn Youngkin, after finishing fourth in the Republican convention held on May 8, 2021.

Early life and education
Born in Petersburg, Virginia, Cox graduated from Colonial Heights High School in 1975. After studying political science and social science at James Madison University, he graduated with a Bachelor of Science (BS) in both fields of study in 1979. He pledged with Theta Chi at James Madison University. Cox received an Associate of Science (AS) in Life Science from the Richard Bland College at the College of William & Mary in 1981.

Political career
Kirk Cox was first elected from the 66th District to the House of Delegates in 1989. The 66th House District includes all of Colonial Heights and parts of Chesterfield County.

In 2017, legislation championed by Cox resulted in the establishment of the Online Virginia Network (OVN). OVN is an online consortium that offers degrees in high demand fields from Virginia public universities. The program began with two universities participating—George Mason University and Old Dominion University—and has since expanded to include the Virginia Community College System.

On January 10, 2018, Cox was unanimously elected as Speaker of the House by the members of the House of Delegates. Upon being sworn in, he became the first Speaker in state history from Colonial Heights, the first Speaker to represent a portion of Chesterfield County since the 1800s, and the first Speaker whose profession was that of a public school teacher.

On February 5, 2019, Cox helped the Virginia House of Delegates pass House Bill 2577 to lift the age cap for autism coverage. Upon passage of the bill, Cox said, "Many of these children are not diagnosed until they are already six or seven years of age and need access to important care for longer than just three or four years." WTKR reported that "no other prevalent health condition—including asthma, diabetes and cancer—has coverage limits that are imposed based on the patient's age. Coverage for all other health conditions is based on medical necessity."

In June 2019, judges declared the House of Delegates' district map illegal due to racial gerrymandering, and imposed a new map. Republican members of the House of Delegates drew the old map in 2011. Cox has opposed the court's ruling, conceding that the map had been drawn to gain political advantage, but not to suppress voters based on race. District 66, represented by Cox, is among the districts that underwent substantial redistricting. The district—as currently drawn—voted for Barack Obama in 2012, Hillary Clinton in 2016, and Joe Biden in 2020; Cox was reelected in 2019.

In July 2019, Cox formally closed a special session on gun control after 1 hour and 30 minutes of deliberation between fellow delegates. Governor Ralph Northam called for the session after the shooting at Virginia Beach, and Cox adjourned the session with no actions taken.

In the 2019 election, Cox was re-elected to a 16th term, but the Republicans lost their majority, making it the first time since 1997 Democrats won the House of Delegates. He relinquished the role of Speaker to Democrat Eileen Filler-Corn on January 8, 2020.

On November 17, 2020, Cox announced his campaign for Governor of Virginia in 2021. Since announcing his run for governor, Cox has not held back from publicly criticizing Governor Ralph Northam on countless topics, the biggest being Northam's handling of the coronavirus pandemic and sending kids back to school. While Cox has accepted the validity of President Joe Biden's victory in the 2020 presidential election, he has shown sympathy for former President Donald Trump's false claim that the election was stolen.

On May 8, 2021, Cox was defeated in the Republican convention, coming in fourth place in a seven-candidate field; he was eliminated in the fourth round of ranked-choice voting, with 14% of the vote.

Personal life
Cox and his wife Julie reside in Colonial Heights, Virginia. They have four sons: Lane, Carter, Blake, and Cameron. Cox taught government at Manchester High School in Chesterfield County until his retirement in 2012.

Electoral history

References

External links

 (Official website)
 (campaign finance)

|-

|-

1957 births
20th-century American politicians
21st-century American politicians
Candidates in the 2021 United States elections
James Madison University alumni
Living people
Speakers of the Virginia House of Delegates
Republican Party members of the Virginia House of Delegates
People from Colonial Heights, Virginia